Zach Williams & The Reformation was an American rock band formed in Jonesboro, Arkansas in 2007 by the group of Zach Williams (acoustic guitar, harmonica and vocals), Red Dorton (bass guitar and vocals), Robby Rigsbee (slide guitar and rhythm guitar), Josh Copeland (lead guitar, rhythm guitar and vocals) and Evan Wilons (drums). The band took their name from the desire to reform or revitalize the southern rock sound.

History
In February 2009, the band hit Young Avenue Music Studios in Memphis, Tennessee to record their first album Electric Revival. The record was released in May 2009.

Over the course of the year the band toured throughout the region in support of the first album with some of the highlights being a show at Gruene Hall and a show at State Theatre with Hill Country Revue, which consists of several members from North Mississippi Allstars.

In 2009, Zach Williams & The Reformation signed with the Teenage Head Music booking agency from Belgium. In December 2009, the band announced a three-week tour of Europe, including shows in the Netherlands, Belgium, France, and Spain. In the summer of 2010 the band made a one-week stop in both Guam and Japan in support of Armed Forces Entertainment. 

In April 2011, the Reformation released A Southern Offering, their second album. In June 2012, the group returned to Spain for a 3-week tour with great reviews, sold-out crowds and a rock-star welcome.

Later in 2012, Williams disbanded the Reformation due to newfound Christian beliefs. He joined The Brothers of Grace, later renamed Zach Williams and the Brothers of Grace. Since 2016, Williams is a solo artist and released the album Chain Breaker on December 14, 2016.

Band members
Zach Williams (acoustic guitar, harmonica and vocals)
Red Dorton (bass guitar and vocals)
Robby Rigsbee (slide guitar, rhythm guitar, and lead guitar)
Josh Copeland (rhythm guitar and lead guitar)
Creed Slater (drums and vocals)

Discography
2009: Electric Revival (Independent)
2011: A Southern Offering (Independent)

References

External links
 On Myspace

2007 establishments in Arkansas
American blues rock musical groups
Jam bands
Musical groups established in 2007
Musical groups disestablished in 2012
Rock music groups from Arkansas
American southern rock musical groups